Parlatoriini is a tribe of armored scale insects. Takagi (2002) indicated that the Parlatoriini appear to be phylogenetically related to the Smilacicola and the Odonaspidini. Takagi went on to say about the tropical east Asian Parlatoriini that, The current classification of their genera may be largely tentative because the adult females are simple-featured and much modified owing to the pupillarial mode of life, and also because the second instar nymphs are generally similar among parlatoriines, whether the adult females are pupillarial or not. Andersen found that separating out pupillarial forms into a separate subtribe, Gymnaspidina, was counterproductive, as being non-dispositive.

Molecular analysis has shown that the Parlatoriini as traditionally constituted is highly non-monophyletic and that the genera, and occasionally species, are interdigitated with the Aspidiotini.

Genera traditionally included in the Parlatoriini

Agrophaspis Borchsenius & Williams, 1963
Annulaspis Ferris, 1938 was in the Odonaspidini,now temporarily placed in the Aspidiotinae
Benaparlatoria Balachowsky, 1953
Bigymnaspis Balachowsky, 1958
Cryptoparlatorea Lindinger, 1905
Cryptoparlatoreopsis Borchsenius, 1950
Doriopus Brimblecombe, 1959
Emmereziaspis
Eugreeeniella
Formosapis
Genaparlatoria
Gymnaspis
Ischnafiorinia
Kochummenaspis
Labidaspis (Green, 1929) with one species
Labidaspis myersi is in the Leucaspidini
Ligaspis
Lindingeria
Madaparlaspis
Mangaspis
Microparlatoria
Mixaspis
Neoparlatoria
Neparla
Paraparlagena
Parlagena
Parlaspis
Parlatoreopsis Lindinger, 1912
Parlatoria
Porogymnaspis
Sakaramyaspis
Silvestraspis
Sishanaspis
Syngenaspis
Tamilparla
Tanaparlatoria

References

 
Aspidiotinae
Hemiptera tribes